Iván Emiliano Borghello (born 21 January 1983 in Paraná) is an Argentine football striker who plays for Club Atlético Paraná.

Career

Borghello made his professional debut in 2001 for Newell's Old Boys. In 2004, he was part of the squad that won the Apertura 2004 championship.

In 2006, he moved to Mexico to play for Santos Laguna B but returned to Argentina after only one season to join Talleres de Córdoba of Primera B Nacional. In 2008, he was signed by newly promoted club Godoy Cruz as a reinforcement for the 2008-09 season.

For the 2010–11 Argentine Primera División season, Borghello returned to Newell's Old Boys.

Honours

References

External links
 BDFA profile 
 
 Argentine Primera statistics  
 Official Club Player Profile 
 

1983 births
Living people
People from Paraná, Entre Ríos
Argentine people of Italian descent
Argentine footballers
Argentine expatriate footballers
Association football forwards
Argentine Primera División players
Primera Nacional players
Ecuadorian Serie A players
Bolivian Primera División players
Newell's Old Boys footballers
Talleres de Córdoba footballers
Godoy Cruz Antonio Tomba footballers
Santos Laguna footballers
S.D. Quito footballers
Barcelona S.C. footballers
All Boys footballers
Club de Gimnasia y Esgrima La Plata footballers
Club Atlético Huracán footballers
Club Bolívar players
Expatriate footballers in Ecuador
Expatriate footballers in Mexico
Expatriate footballers in Bolivia
Argentine expatriate sportspeople in Ecuador
Argentine expatriate sportspeople in Mexico
Argentine expatriate sportspeople in Bolivia
Sportspeople from Entre Ríos Province